Herbulotiana is a genus of moths of the family Depressariidae from Madagascar.

Species
Species of this genus are:
Herbulotiana abceda Viette, 1954
Herbulotiana altitudinella Viette, 1963
Herbulotiana atypicella Viette, 1956
Herbulotiana benoistella Viette, 1954
Herbulotiana bernardiiella Viette, 1954
Herbulotiana bicolorata Viette, 1954
Herbulotiana catalaella Viette, 1954
Herbulotiana collectella Viette, 1956
Herbulotiana halarcta (Meyrick, 1917)
Herbulotiana longifascia Viette, 1954
Herbulotiana paulianella Viette, 1954
Herbulotiana robustella Viette, 1956
Herbulotiana rungsella Viette, 1954
Herbulotiana septella Viette, 1956
Herbulotiana vadonella Viette, 1956
Herbulotiana violacea Viette, 1954
Herbulotiana zorobella Viette, 1988

See also
 List of moths of Madagascar

References
 Viette, 1954. Description de nouveaux Tineides Malgaches (Lépidoptères). Mémoires de l'Institut scientifique de Madagascar (E)5: 23–24, figs. 25, 27

 
 
Stenomatinae